Vetri Vinayaha  College of Engineering and Technology  is a Private Engineering College located in Thottiyam, Tiruchirappalli District, India. The college was established in the year 2006 by Thiru G. Sekar .

Course Offered (Departments) 
 B.E / Civil Engineering. 
 B.E / Computer Science Engineering.
 B.E / Electronic Communication Engineering.
 B.E / Electric and Electronic Engineering.
 B.E / Mechanical Engineering.

Eligibility for Admission 
Candidates should have passed in the H.S.C Examination of the State Board of Tamil Nadu or any other equivalent examination..

Transport 
More than 30 college buses help the students & staff to commute to the college from various places especially all city areas.

Hostel 
There are separate hostels for Boys and Girls in the campus. Boy's hostel is situated inside the college campus in an area of 5,000 sq.ft of land The Boys Hostel accommodates 600 boy's and the Girls hostel accommodates
300 Girls.

Library 
The Vetri Vinayaha College Of Engineering And Technology  Library established in the year 2006 July was housed in a class room with 3500 books to start with.

References

External links
 Vetri Vinayaha College Of Engineering And Technology  Official Website

Engineering colleges in Chennai